East Finley Township is a township in Washington County, Pennsylvania, United States. The population was 1,287 at the 2020 census.

History
The Scott Brownlee Covered Bridge, Plant's Covered Bridge, Sprowl's Covered Bridge and Wyit Sprowls Covered Bridge are listed on the National Register of Historic Places.

Geography

Demographics
At the 2000 census there were 1,489 people, 516 households, and 423 families living in the township.  The population density was 42.4 people per square mile (16.4/km2).  There were 550 housing units at an average density of 15.7/sq mi (6.0/km2).  The racial makeup of the township was 99.73% White, 0.13% African American, 0.07% Native American, and 0.07% from two or more races.
Of the 516 households 36.6% had children under the age of 18 living with them, 71.7% were married couples living together, 6.2% had a female householder with no husband present, and 18.0% were non-families. 15.7% of households were one person and 7.4% were one person aged 65 or older.  The average household size was 2.84 and the average family size was 3.17.

The age distribution was 27.0% under the age of 18, 6.9% from 18 to 24, 28.2% from 25 to 44, 26.1% from 45 to 64, and 11.9% 65 or older.  The median age was 38 years. For every 100 females, there were 109.1 males.  For every 100 females age 18 and over, there were 103.2 males.

The median household income was $39,063 and the median family income  was $43,516. Males had a median income of $31,250 versus $20,078 for females. The per capita income for the township was $14,675.  About 9.9% of families and 12.1% of the population were below the poverty line, including 18.6% of those under age 18 and 4.4% of those age 65 or over.

References

Townships in Washington County, Pennsylvania
Pittsburgh metropolitan area
Townships in Pennsylvania